The 1984 NCAA Women's Division I Swimming and Diving Championships were contested at the third annual NCAA-sanctioned swim meet to determine the team and individual national champions of Division I women's collegiate swimming and diving in the United States. 

This year's events were hosted by Indiana University at the Indiana University Natatorium in Indianapolis, Indiana. 

Texas topped the team standings, finishing 68 points ahead of defending champions Stanford, claiming the Longhorns' first women's team title.

Team standings
Note: Top 10 only
(H) = Hosts
(DC) = Defending champions
Full results

See also
List of college swimming and diving teams

References

NCAA Division I Swimming And Diving Championships
NCAA Division I Swimming And Diving Championships
NCAA Division I Women's Swimming and Diving Championships